Bidens macroptera, or adey abeba, is a flowering plant native to Ethiopia. In Ethiopia, adey abeba symbolizes the end of the rainy season and the start of summer. It also indicates the end of a year and the beginning of a new one. For Ethiopian New Year (Enkutatash), a group of young girls sing the traditional new year song Abebayehosh and give adey abeba to their parents and loved ones as a symbol of luck and blessing for the new year.

References 

macroptera